Tidball is a surname. Notable people with the surname include:

Derek Tidball, British theologian and sociologist
M. Elizabeth Tidball (1929–2014), American physiologist
Jeff Tidball, American game designer 
John C. Tidball (1825–1906), American Union Army colonel during the Civil War